Dame Yasmin Bevan,  (née Prodhan; born 3 December 1953) is an influential figure within the UK education system.

Bevan was the Executive Principal and Headteacher of Denbigh High School in Luton, Bedfordshire from 1991 until her retirement. She contributed to policy development through the Expert Group on Assessment and the Practitioners Group on School Behaviour and Attendance. She has also chaired the Department for Education's Secondary Heads Reference Group from March 2010.

In 2007 she was made a Dame of the Order of the British Empire for services to education and in 2013 she appeared in Who's Who.

Awards
 Teaching Awards Special Commendation in 2003
 Teaching Awards Headteacher of the Year in 2005
 Awarded honorary doctorate in April 2008
 Became a National Leader of Education in 2009 (NLE)
 In 2009, Denbigh High School won the Times Educational Supplement's 'Secondary School of the Year' Award.

Affiliations
 DCSF Secondary Education Adviser in June 2007
 Former member of DfEE Race Education and Employment Forum
 Former governor Luton Sixth Form College
 Member, governing council of the National College of School Leadership and Corporate Plan Reference Group (2000–04)
 Member, DfES headteacher reference group that advises the DfES Practitioners’ Group on Pupil Behaviour and Attendance
 Member of the DfES headteacher reference group that advises the Department for Children, Schools and Families
 Member of DfES citizenship education working party
 Member of the DfES Practitioners Group on School Behaviour and Discipline
 Headteachers' representative on a regional consultative head's group for the School Improvement Partners Programme
 NCSL Secondary Director (temporary secondment)
 DfES Ten year childcare strategy stakeholder group
 Advisory Group on National Leaders of Education 2006

References

External links
 Dame Yasmin Bevan - short interview on the merits of conversion to Academy status

Schoolteachers from Bedfordshire
Dames Commander of the Order of the British Empire
People from Luton
1953 births
Place of birth missing (living people)
Living people